The 1996 Yonex All England Open was the 86th edition of the All England Open Badminton Championships. It was held from 11 to 16 March 1996, in Birmingham, England.

It was a five-star tournament and the prize money was US$125,000.

Venue
National Indoor Arena

Final results

Men's singles

Section 1

Section 2

Women's singles

Section 1

Section 2

References

External links
Smash: 1996 All England Open

All England Open Badminton Championships
All England Open
All England
Sports competitions in Birmingham, West Midlands
March 1996 sports events in the United Kingdom